Matt Schmit (born 1979) is a Minnesota politician and former member of the Minnesota Senate. A member of the Minnesota Democratic–Farmer–Labor Party (DFL), he represented District 21 in southeastern Minnesota.

Early life, education, and career
Schmit was born and raised in Red Wing, Minnesota. He graduated from Red Wing High School. He attended Saint John's University, graduating with a B.A. in biology and political science. He later attended the Hubert H. Humphrey School of Public Affairs at the University of Minnesota, graduating with a M.P.P. He is a public policy consultant.

Minnesota Senate
Schmit was first elected to the Minnesota Senate in 2012. He lost re-election to Republican Mike Goggin in 2016. While a member of the Senate, Schmit resided in Red Wing, Minnesota.

Illinois Office of Broadband
In 2019, Schmit was appointed the head of the Illinois Department of Commerce and Economic Opportunity's Office of Broadband. Schmit will manage the “Connect Illinois” program and work with the state's Broadband Advisory Council.

References

External links

1979 births
Living people
Minnesota state senators
Year of birth uncertain
21st-century American politicians